Valeri Beim (born 17 March 1950 in Odessa), is Soviet-born, Austrian and Israeli chess grandmaster and author.

References

1950 births
Living people
Chess grandmasters
Austrian chess players